Rungia is a genus of flowering plants belonging to the family Acanthaceae.

Its native range is Tropical Africa (within Angola, Benin, Burundi, Cameroon, Central African Republic, Congo, Ethiopia, Gabon, Ghana, Guinea, Gulf of Guinea Islands, Guinea-Bissau, Ivory Coast, Liberia, Mali, Nigeria, Senegal, Sierra Leone, Sudan, Tanzania, Uganda and  Democratic Republic of the Congo), southern Arabian Peninsula (within Oman and Yemen), Tropical and Subtropical Asia (within the Andaman Islands, Assam, Bangladesh, Cambodia, China, East Himalaya, Hainan, India, Java, Laccadive Islands, Laos, Lesser Sunda Islands, Malaya, Maldives, Myanmar, Nepal, New Guinea, Philippines, Sri Lanka, Sulawesi, Sumatera, Taiwan, Thailand, Tibet, Vietnam and West Himalaya  ).
 
The genus name of Rungia is in honour of Friedlieb Ferdinand Runge (1794–1867), a German analytical chemist. It was first described and published in N.Wallich, Pl. Asiat. Rar. Vol.3 on page 77 in 1832.

Known species
According to Kew:

Rungia adnata 
Rungia apiculata 
Rungia axilliflora 
Rungia beddomei 
Rungia bisaccata 
Rungia blumeana 
Rungia brandisii 
Rungia burmanica 
Rungia caespitosa 
Rungia camerunensis 
Rungia chamaedryoides 
Rungia chinensis 
Rungia clauda 
Rungia congoensis 
Rungia crenata 
Rungia daklakensis 
Rungia densiflora 
Rungia dimorpha 
Rungia diversibracteata 
Rungia diversiformis 
Rungia eberhardtii 
Rungia elegans 
Rungia eriostachya 
Rungia evrardii 
Rungia flaviflora 
Rungia grandis 
Rungia guangxiensis 
Rungia guineensis 
Rungia heterophylla 
Rungia himalayensis 
Rungia hirpex 
Rungia incompta 
Rungia khasiana 
Rungia khoii 
Rungia klossii 
Rungia laeta 
Rungia latior 
Rungia lepida 
Rungia letestui 
Rungia linifolia 
Rungia longifolia 
Rungia longipes 
Rungia maculata 
Rungia mastersii 
Rungia membranacea 
Rungia mina 
Rungia minutiflora 
Rungia monetaria 
Rungia naoensis 
Rungia napoensis 
Rungia oligoneura 
Rungia paxiana 
Rungia pectinata 
Rungia philippinensis 
Rungia pierrei 
Rungia pinpienensis 
Rungia podostachya 
Rungia punduana 
Rungia pungens 
Rungia purpurascens 
Rungia repens 
Rungia rivicola 
Rungia rungioides 
Rungia salaccensis 
Rungia saranganensis 
Rungia schliebenii 
Rungia selangorensis 
Rungia silvatica 
Rungia sinothailandica 
Rungia sisparensis 
Rungia smeruensis 
Rungia stolonifera 
Rungia subtilifolia 
Rungia sumatrana 
Rungia taiwanensis 
Rungia tenuissima 
Rungia tonkinensis 
Rungia tristichantha 
Rungia vegeta 
Rungia wightiana 
Rungia yunnanensis

References

Acanthaceae
Acanthaceae genera
Plants described in 1832
Taxa named by Christian Gottfried Daniel Nees von Esenbeck